1. FC Nürnberg is a German football club based in Nuremberg, Bavaria. The club is the country's second most successful side, having been crowned German champions nine times, and won more national championship titles than any other club before the inception of the Bundesliga.

Nürnberg were founding members of the Bundesliga, and won the league once in 1968. The club has also won the DFB-Pokal four times.

Nürnberg have struggled to emulate the success of their earlier years, and have been relegated from the Bundesliga on eight occasions - more times than any other German club.

Key

Key to league record:
Pld = Matches played
W = Matches won
D = Matches drawn
L = Matches lost
GF = Goals for
GA = Goals against
Pts = Points
Pos = Final position

Key to rounds:
NH = Not held
QR = Qualification round
GS = Group stage
R1 = Round 1
R2 = Round 2

R3 = Round 3
QF = Quarter-finals
SF = Semi-finals
RU = Runners-up
W = Winners

Early years (until 1933)

Gauliga era (1933–1945)

Oberliga era (1945–1963)

Bundesliga era (1963–)

Notes 
A.  Nürnberg qualified for the South German Championship, but chose not to participate.
B.  Defeated MTV München 1879 to qualify for the South German Championship.
C.  Defeated Bayern Munich and MTV Augsburg to qualify for the South German Championship.
D.  Defeated MTV München 1879 to qualify for the South German Championship.
E.  Failed to qualify for the South German Championship, finishing 2nd behind Bayern Munich in the group.
F.  Failed to qualify for the South German Championship, losing to Bayern Munich.
G.  Failed to qualify for the South German Championship, losing to SpVgg Fürth. However, they qualified for the German Championship as defending champions.
H.  The championship was awarded to Hamburg after Nürnberg were reduced to seven men in the final. HSV later declined the title.
I.  Defeated SpVgg Fürth in a playoff to win the league, after both sides finished level on points.
J.  Qualified for the German Championship as the best second or third placed side in the Bezirksliga Bayern.
K.  Finished 4th in the promotion play-off group.
L.  Finished 2nd in the promotion play-off group.
M.  Lost to Borussia Dortmund in the promotion play-off.
N.  Defeated Rot-Weiss Essen in the promotion play-off.
O.  Nürnberg were deducted 6 points for a breach of the licensing regulations.
P.  Defeated Energie Cottbus in the promotion/relegation play-off.
Q.  Defeated Augsburg in the promotion/relegation play-off.
R.  Lost to Eintracht Frankfurt in the promotion/relegation play-off.
S.  Defeated FC Ingolstadt in the relegation play-off.

References

1. FC Nürnberg at worldfootball.net
Regionalliga statistics

Seasons
Nurnberg
German football club statistics